The Passage Key National Wildlife Refuge is part of the United States National Wildlife Refuge (NWR) System, located offshore from St. Petersburg. The  refuge was established in 1905 by President Theodore Roosevelt to preserve nesting colonies of native seabirds and wading birds. It was established in 1970, to protect native birds and serve as a breeding ground for them.

Management
Passage Key NWR is one of the three 'Tampa Bay Refuges', and was administered as a part of the Chassahowitzka National Wildlife Refuge Complex but was changed to the Crystal River National Wildlife Refuge Complex. The complex manages the Pinellas National Wildlife Refuge, Passage Key National Wildlife Refuge, Chassahowitzka National Wildlife Refuge, Egmont Key National Wildlife Refuge, and the Crystal River National Wildlife Refuge.

Disappearing island
It began in 1921 with a hurricane that destroyed a freshwater lake and most of the vegetation. The island, first known as Isla de San Francisco y Leon, then Burnaby Island, and later as Cayo del Pasaje or Passage Key, was a  barrier island teeming with laughing gulls, royal terns, black skimmers, sandwich terns, brown pelicans and oystercatchers. The hurricanes of 2005 reduced the island to the current state that must be saved or allowed to disappear. Since then, the refuge is closed to all public use.

References

External links
 Passage Key National Wildlife Refuge

Protected areas of Manatee County, Florida
National Wildlife Refuges in Florida
Protected areas established in 1905
1905 establishments in Florida